Henrietta-Caroleen High School, also known as Tri-High, Tri-Community Elementary, and Chase Middle School, is a historic high school building located near Mooresboro, Rutherford County, North Carolina.  It was designed by architect Leslie Boney (1880-1964) and built in 1925. It is a two-story on basement, "T"-plan, Classical Revival style red brick building.  The front facade features a monumental, two-story, portico with a denticulated pediment supported by fluted Corinthian order columns. A brick gymnasium addition was built in 1935 and a hip-roofed, concrete block, addition to it was added in 1952.  Also on the property are the contributing cafeteria building (1955, 1967), and a World War II Commemorative Marker (c. 1950). The building houses Thomas Jefferson Classical Academy, a public charter school.

It was added to the National Register of Historic Places in 2005.

References

High schools in North Carolina
School buildings on the National Register of Historic Places in North Carolina
Neoclassical architecture in North Carolina
School buildings completed in 1925
Buildings and structures in Rutherford County, North Carolina
National Register of Historic Places in Rutherford County, North Carolina
1925 establishments in North Carolina